The Mennonite World Conference (MWC) is a Mennonite Anabaptist Christian denomination. Its headquarters are in Kitchener, Ontario, Canada.

History
The first Mennonite World Conference was held in Basel in 1925. Its main purpose was to celebrate the 400th anniversary of Anabaptism. An assembly is convened approximately every six or seven years.

Christian Neff (1863–1946), a Mennonite minister in Germany, is often called the "father" of the Mennonite World Conference. Neff, through the Conference of Mennonites in South Germany, issued the call for the first gathering in 1925, and was president of the following meetings in 1930 and 1936.

The MWC prints a quarterly news publication in three languages—Spanish (as ), English (Courier), and French (.) This project began in 1986. The Mennonite World Conference considers that its mission is to (1) be a global community of faith in the Anabaptist-tradition, (2) facilitate relationships between Anabaptist-related churches worldwide, and (3) relate to other Christian world communions and organizations.

The official repository of Mennonite World Conference is the Mennonite Church USA Archives.

According to a 2022 denomination census, it has 107 member denominations in 59 countries, and 1,47 million baptized members in 10,300 churches.

Beliefs 
The Conference has an Anabaptist confession of faith.

Conferences

Notes

References
Mennonite Encyclopedia, Harold S. Bender, Cornelius J. Dyck, Dennis D. Martin, et al., editors

External links

Official website
Member churches and General Council
Mennonite World Conference in the Global Anabaptist Mennonite Encyclopedia Online

 
Anabaptist organizations
Mennonitism
Mennonite denominations